My Boyfriends' Dogs is a 2014 American made-for-television comedy film directed by Terry Ingram, written by Jon Maas and Gary Goldstein, and based on the Dandi Daley Mackall novel of the same name. The film stars Erika Christensen as Bailey Daley, with Teryl Rothery, Emily Holmes, Jeremy Guilbaut, Joyce DeWitt, and Michael Kopsa. It was broadcast on the Hallmark Channel in the United States on October 18, 2014.

Plot
The owners of a small diner are surprised one rainy evening when, just after closing, a young woman (Christensen) wearing a wedding dress – with three dogs in tow – begs to come into their restaurant. What follows is her retelling of how she arrived at this curious junction in her life and how, through the search for the right man, she ended up as a runaway bride with three dogs.

Summary
Bailey (Erika Christensen) meets Wade (Jesse Hutch), who has a dog named Adam, a golden retriever. She also meets Cole (Tyron Leitso), who owns Cole's Pet Stop. She meets Jonathan (Oliver Rice) at an art gallery; he has a dog named Eve, a dalmatian.

Bailey and Amber (Emily Holmes) meet Eric (Jeremy Guilbaut) at yoga class. Eric teaches Bailey how to golf. Eric's mother picks a dog called "Shih-Tzu". Bailey named Eric's dog Shirley after her sister.  Bailey now has three dogs of her own.

Eric and Bailey get married but Bailey decides to run away with her dogs. She can't find the right guy for her. Nikki tells Bailey her stories: she works at a restaurant waiting for her prince charming walking through the door. Cole is sitting with a book every night.

Cast
 Erika Christensen as Bailey Daley
 Teryl Rothery as Dina
 Jeremy Guilbaut as Eric
 Emily Holmes as Amber
 Joyce DeWitt as Nikki
 Michael Kopsa as Louie
 Jesse Hutch as Wade
 Tyron Leitso as Cole
 Oliver Rice as Jonathan
 Jeb Beach as Travis
 Malcolm Stewart as Martin Strang
 Linda Sorenson as Grandma Strang
 P. Lynn Johnson as Eleanor Strang
 Samuel Patrick Chu as Evan
 Louriza Tronco as Tessa

Reception
The film received mixed reviews from television critics. David Hinckley of New York Daily News wrote: "You wouldn't think a Hallmark movie that stars a plucky, winsome blond and several lovable dogs could miss. My Boyfriends' Dogs almost does. It's got too much of the right stuff to be a complete mutt, but most Hallmark movies are better written and crafted than this one." Nancy Dunham of The Washington Times gave a mixed review, writing: "Erika Christensen brings a sense of realism to the role, even when some dialogue seems a bit preachy and scenes might stretch credibility a tad far... Like Walt Disney films, My Boyfriends' Dogs isn't going to make a huge impact on art, but it might show the best way to be true to one's heart."

References

External links
 

2014 television films
2014 films
2010s English-language films
American comedy television films
2010s American films